Freaky Fortune was a Greek musical duo consisting of vocalist Nicolas "Nick" Raptakis (born 30 April 1990) and producer Theofilos "Teo" Pouzbouris (born 9 February 1991). They represented Greece in the Eurovision Song Contest 2014 together with RiskyKidd with the song "Rise Up".

Career

2012–2013: Early beginnings
Raptakis and Pouzbouris broke through within the internet community after winning a cover competition organised by blogger Perez Hilton with their cover of the song "Part of Me" (originally by Katy Perry). After their win, they released three singles: "Our Destiny", "Stronger" and "All I Need (This Summer)", with which they had local radio success.

2014: Eurovision Song Contest

In 2014, the duo was chosen to represent Greece in the Eurovision Song Contest 2014 along with the rapper RiskyKidd with the song "Rise Up". "Rise Up" came 20th in the final of Eurovision 2014.
Their following single "In a World Without You" was released on 25 June 2014, receiving positive reviews from music critics. The song was a collaboration with the Greek DJ Nicolas Costa who also wrote the song, while the production was done by him and Freaky Fortune.

Discography

Singles

References

Greek musical duos
Eurovision Song Contest entrants for Greece
Eurovision Song Contest entrants of 2014
Modern Greek-language singers